Kaveinga orbitosa is a species of ground beetle in the subfamily Rhysodinae. It was described by Broun in 1880.

References

Kaveinga
Beetles described in 1880